Mohammed Shakeer (born 15 November 1986) is an Indian former cricketer. He played three first-class matches for Hyderabad between 2007 and 2008.

See also
 List of Hyderabad cricketers

References

External links
 

1986 births
Living people
Indian cricketers
Hyderabad cricketers
Cricketers from Hyderabad, India